Tatyana Nikolayevna Andrianova (born 10 December 1979 in Yaroslavl) is a Russian former middle-distance runner who specialized in the 800 metres. She did not compete in the 2006 and 2007 seasons, but improved on her personal best time in 800 metres in 2008.

Career 
In the 2004 Olympics in Athens, Andrianova was fifth in the final, so in the 2005 World Championships she was a favourite. When she received a bronze medal, she regarded it as a defeat. “I was so upset with that bronze,” Andrianova says. “I was already planning to get married and give birth to my child, and I was not sure I would be back on the track again. I was thinking probably it was my last World Championships. That’s why, when the things went wrong from the very beginning, it made me so nervous”.

In 2006, she had her worst results but after the birth of her son Nikita, Andrianova began training as she was sure that her best results were about to come. In the 2008 Olympics in Beijing, Andrianova was hoping for a medal as she so narrowly missed out in the 2004 Olympics, however, she was placed eighth in the finals.

Doping suspension

The IAAF reported in December 2015 that Andrianova would be retroactively suspended for testing positive for the performance-enhancing drug stanozolol. The test invalidated her results from 9 August 2005 to 8 August 2007. On 14 April 2016 the Court of Arbitration for Sport (CAS) has overturned an Andrianova's two-year doping suspension because her sample was retested beyond the eight-year statute of limitations. "As the eight-year statute of limitations had expired prior to 1 January 2015, the 10-year statute of limitations provided under the new 2015 anti-doping rules cannot apply," CAS said in a statement.

International competitions

Personal bests
800 metres - 1:56.00 min (2008)
1500 metres - 4:12.02 min (2005)

See also
List of doping cases in athletics
List of World Athletics Championships medalists (women)
800 metres at the World Championships in Athletics
List of people from Yaroslavl

References

External links
 
 Photographs at sportphoto.ru

1979 births
Living people
Sportspeople from Yaroslavl
Russian female middle-distance runners
Olympic female middle-distance runners
Olympic athletes of Russia
Athletes (track and field) at the 2004 Summer Olympics
Athletes (track and field) at the 2008 Summer Olympics
World Athletics Championships athletes for Russia
World Athletics Championships medalists
Russian Athletics Championships winners
Russian sportspeople in doping cases
Doping cases in athletics